Army Remount Depot Mona is a depot of the Pakistan Army situated in Mandi Bahauddin, Punjab, Pakistan. It was established in 1902 and is home to breeding grounds for horses, mules and donkeys. It was originally designed to supply mountain artillery mules and general service mules. Mona is a full member of the World Arabian Horse Organization (WAHO). It is the largest functional remount installation in the world and is spread over 10,000 acres.

History
Mona started breeding horses in 1902. Donkey and mule breeding studs were established in 1906.  The name Mona Depot was adopted from the local syed village MONA SYEDDAN.  The land occupied by the Depot was originally owned by the syed's in this area, this was officially granted to the government in the late 18th Century.

A museum at the Army Remount Depot Mona displays the carriages used by Muhammad Ali Jinnah, Queen Elizabeth II as well as those used in the early 19th century.

Equitation School
The Army Equitation School trains officers and junior-ranked personnel of the Pakistan Army and the countries of Saudi Arabia, UAE, Bangladesh, Jordan, Malaysia, Sri Lanka and Nepal in equestrian sports such as polo, dressage, show jumping and riding.

References

External links

Official websites
 Official website of Pakistan Army launched on 6 April 2009
 Official website of Inter Services Public Relations (ISPR)
Unofficial Website 
 Pakistan Defence

Farms in Pakistan
Horse farms
Military installations of Pakistan
Pakistan Army
Mandi Bahauddin District